Anutap is a 1992 Bengali family drama film directed by Prabhat Roy. The Film stars Debashree Roy as the protagonist. It also stars Raj Babbar, Deepankar De, Anup Kumar, Rabi Ghosh, Soumitra Chatterjee, and Dilip Mukherjee.

Cast 

 Debashree Roy
 Raj Babbar, 
 Deepankar De
 Anup Kumar
 Rabi Ghosh
 Nirmal Kumar
 Sagarika
 Soumitra Chatterjee
 Dilip Mukherjee
 Sanghamitra Bandyopadhyay
 Soumitra Bannerjee
 Master Shibam

References

External links

Anutap on Amazon
Anutap on YouTube

1992 films
Bengali-language Indian films
1992 drama films
Indian drama films
Films directed by Prabhat Roy
1990s Bengali-language films